The Diocese of Pannonia (lit. "Diocese of the Pannonias"), from 395 known as the Diocese of Illyricum, was a diocese of the Late Roman Empire. The seat of the vicarius (governor of the diocese) was Sirmium.

History
It was originally part of the praetorian prefecture of Italy and was incorporated by the praetorian prefecture of Illyricum when it was established in 347.

Disputed by the two halves of the Empire in the following years, the Diocese of Pannonia was one of the two dioceses in the eastern quarters of the Tetrarchy not belonging to the cultural Greek half of the empire (the other was Dacia), and so it was transferred back to the Western Empire at the death of Theodosius I in 395 and was joined to the Prefecture of Italy as the Diocese of Illyricum.

In 425 Galla Placidia gave the diocese of Illyricum to Eastern Emperor Theodosius II.

Its ultimate fate is uncertain. Pannonia was lost to the Huns in the 440s, although Dalmatia was retained by the Western Empire until c. 480.

The Ostrogoth king of Italy Theodoric the Great conquered Pannonia in the late 5th century, possibly reestablishing the diocese.

Structure 
The Diocese of Pannonia (Diocese of Illyricum occidentalis) included the Roman provinces of Pannonia Prima, Pannonia Valeria, Pannonia Savia, Pannonia Secunda, Noricum Mediterraneum, Noricum Ripensis and Dalmatia.

Also under its jurisdiction were the Exarch of Sirmium, the Metropolis of Lauriacum, Vindomana, Sirmium, Salona, Salisburgium and the "locus incertus" (the "unknown location", see: Miholjanec).

List of known Vicars
 Valerius Licinius (308-314).

Later usage of the term

In the 9th century, Diocese of Pannonia was also a name of the ecclesiastical territory of the Christian church whose archbishop was Saint Methodius.

See also
Pannonia
Praetorian prefecture of Illyricum
Illyricum (Roman province)

References

Literature

External links
Illyricum
Map

Pannonia
Pannonia
Praetorian prefecture of Illyricum
Praetorian prefecture of Italy
Illyricum (Roman province)
Austria in the Roman era
Bosnia and Herzegovina in the Roman era
Croatia in the Roman era
Dalmatia (Roman province)
Hungary in the Roman era
Serbia in the Roman era
Slovenia in the Roman era
Ancient history of Vojvodina
History of Syrmia
Historical regions of Bosnia and Herzegovina
Historical regions in Slovenia
314 establishments
States and territories established in the 310s
4th-century establishments in the Roman Empire
440s disestablishments
5th-century disestablishments in the Roman Empire